Cirrisalarias bunares, the hairy blenny or medusa blenny, is a species of combtooth blenny found in the western central Pacific and Indian Oceans.  This species is the only known member of its genus.

References

Salarinae
Taxa named by Victor G. Springer
Fish described in 1976